Aghamore GAA is a Gaelic Athletic Association club in the parish of Aghamore, County Mayo in Ireland, focusing primarily on Gaelic football. The club competes at senior level in the Mayo Senior Football Championship. The club competes in Ladies' Gaelic football under the name of St. Mary's.

Achievements
 Mayo Senior Football Championship Runners-Up 1971, 1974, 1975
 Mayo Under-21 A Football Championship Winners 1981, 2015, 2016

Notable players
 Brendan Harrison, 2016 All Star
 Alan Freeman

References

Gaelic games clubs in County Mayo
Gaelic football clubs in County Mayo